James Smith (25 June 1896 – 24 November 1945) was a Scottish footballer who played for clubs including Rangers and Aberdeen as an outside left, though he began his career as a left back. He was the son of Nicol Smith, who also played as a defender with great success for Rangers and Scotland.

A son of the famous "Nick" Smith, the Rangers and Scotland back, Jimmy who at the outset of his football career was also a back, was transferred from Rangers to Aberdeen in 1922. Shortly afterwards he was tried at outside-left and made the position his own for ten seasons. During that period Smith played many brilliant games for the Dons and scored many notable goals.

After leaving football Smith entered the catering business and became licensee of a hotel in Dufftown. On returning to Aberdeen he took over the managership of a licensed establishment, but had to resign when his health gave way.

The native of Darvel, was 49 years of age when he died in Woodend Hospital in Aberdeen in 1945.

Career statistics

Club

Appearances and goals by club, season and competition

References

1896 births
1945 deaths
Footballers from East Ayrshire
Association football wingers
Scottish footballers
Scottish football managers
Larkhall Thistle F.C. players
Rangers F.C. players
Glentoran F.C. players
Shamrock Rovers F.C. players
Brora Rangers F.C. players
Scottish Football League players
Scottish Junior Football Association players
Highland Football League players
NIFL Premiership players
League of Ireland players
Scottish expatriate sportspeople in Ireland
Expatriate association footballers in the Republic of Ireland
Scottish expatriate footballers